The Castilla y León Cup (from the Spanish expression Copa Castilla y León) is a football championship usually played on summer and autumn between the most important teams in the region of Castilla y León. It was created in 1924 as a regional championship parallel to La Liga, and was played between that year and 1931. The Spanish Civil War and the undisputed leadership of La Liga wiped out the tournament, being forgotten. In 1985, the Football Federation of Castile and León revived it as a summer tournament, being played in just that year. It was in 2009 when it returned to be played on an annual basis.

The tournament is not expected to be played in 2014.

Tournament editions

1924–25 Edition 

Note: UD Española disqualified because of an improper starting 11. The remaining matches are considered defeats, so CD Español scored 4 extra points and Cultural Leonesa scored only 2, breaking the tie between those teams.

1925–26 Edition

1926–27 Edition

Note: The match between UD Española and Stadium Luises, both teams from Salamanca, was suspended because of a fight between players and spectators.

1927–28 Edition

1928–29 Edition

Background 

In 1928, Real Unión Deportiva and CD Español were merged into Real Valladolid. In Salamanca, UD Española became UD Salamanca, disappearing Stadium Luises. The new name, "UD Salamanca" was formalized during the Second Republic of Spain in 1932, but the team used that name for the Castilla y León Cup.

Results

Tie-break match

1929–30 Edition

Qualifying match 

Real Valladolid qualified after 11–0 victory

Results

1930–31 Edition

Note: played two rounds of 4 matches.

1985 Summer Edition

Qualifying match 

Real Valladolid qualified after 3–1 victory

Quarterfinals

Real Ávila won 3–2 on aggregate

Real Valladolid qualified after 4–0 victory

Palencia won 6–3 on aggregate

UD Salamanca won 3–2 on aggregate

Semifinals

Real Valladolid advanced to final after 3–0 victory

UD Salamanca advanced to final. Won 2–1 on aggregate

Final

2009–13 trophy

Titles by team

Winners of the tournament:

Modern trophy

References

 
Football cup competitions in Spain